The Wide White Space gallery was an art gallery in Antwerp, Belgium. It opened on the ground floor of the house known as "Het Bootje" in Antwerp's Plaatsnijdersstraat  in Autumn 1966.
Early exhibitions included works by Dr Hugo Heyrman (The Happy Spacemaker) and Panamarenko.
In its first years the gallery hosted many of the leading lights of the European art scene.
The gallery was an initiative of Anny De Decker and Bernd Lohaus. It closed in 1976.
During its existence the gallery showed work by artists such as Carl André, Richard Artschwager, Marcel Broodthaers, Daniel Buren, Christo, Dan Flavin, Gotthard Graubner, Edward Kienholz, Bruce Naumann, Richard Long, Piero Manzoni, Gerhard Richter, Dieter Roth, Bernard Schultze, Niele Toroni, Günther Uecker, Victor Vasarely and Andy Warhol. Wide White Space worked particularly closely with Joseph Beuys,
In 2012 Anny De Decker was honoured with the ART COLOGNE prize of €10,000 for her work with Wide White Space Gallery.
For a more comprehensive overview see the corresponding German Wikipedia page.

References

External links
Dr Hugo Heyrman 
Panamarenko 
Anny De Decker 

Museums in Antwerp
Art museums and galleries in Belgium
1966 establishments in Belgium
1976 disestablishments in Belgium
Art galleries established in 1966
Art galleries disestablished in 1976